Alan Hannah (born 25 November 1971 in Stranraer, Scotland) is a Scottish curler and curling coach from Renfrew, Scotland.

He started coaching in 2005. Since 2015 he has been the coach of Bruce Mouat's team.

Teams

Record as a coach of national teams

Record as a coach of club teams

References

External links
 
 
 

Living people
1971 births
People from Stranraer
People from Renfrew
Scottish male curlers
Scottish curling coaches